The 1999 ABN AMRO World Tennis Tournament was a men's tennis tournament played on indoor carpet courts. It was the 27th edition of the event known that year as the ABN AMRO World Tennis Tournament, and was part of the ATP International Series Gold of the 1999 ATP Tour. It took place at the Rotterdam Ahoy indoor sporting arena in Rotterdam, Netherlands, from 15 February  through 21 February 1999. Second-seeded Yevgeny Kafelnikov won the singles title.

The singles field featured ATP No. 4, ATP Tour World Championships winner, and recent Sydney finalist Àlex Corretja, Australian Open champion, Halle and Moscow titlist Yevgeny Kafelnikov, and Tashkent and Basel winner, Doha runner-up Tim Henman. Also lined up were Stuttgart Super 9 titlist Richard Krajicek, Paris Super 9 champion Greg Rusedski, Karol Kučera, Thomas Enqvist and Goran Ivanišević.

Finals

Singles

 Yevgeny Kafelnikov defeated  Tim Henman, 6–2, 7–6(7–3)
It was Yevgeny Kafelnikov's 2nd title of the year, and his 19th overall.

Doubles

 David Adams /  John-Laffnie de Jager defeated  Neil Broad /  Peter Tramacchi, 6–7(5–7), 6–3, 6–4

External links
Official website
Singles draw
Doubles draw

 
ABN AMRO World Tennis Tournament
ABN AMRO World Tennis Tournament
ABN AMRO World Tennis Tournament